Boccabadati is am Italian surname. Notable people with the surname include:

 Giovanni Battista Boccabadati (1635–1696), Italian lawyer, mathematician, engineer, and writer, especially of plays
 Luigia Boccabadati (1800–1850), Italian operatic soprano

Italian-language surnames